The Visitation is the 16th studio album by the English rock band Magnum, released in 2011 by SPV. The album registered the following chart positions: Germany No. 19, Sweden No. 28, UK No. 55, and Switzerland No. 56.

The cover was painted by Rodney Matthews. It refers to the track Doors to Nowhere, in which Tony Clarkin looks back at his childhood. According to Catley, the album was heavier than the previous one, with more emphasis on guitars. Clarkin commented,

Track listing

Personnel
Tony Clarkin — guitar
Bob Catley — vocals
Al Barrow — bass guitar
Mark Stanway — keyboards
Harry James — drums

References

External links
 www.magnumonline.co.uk — Official Magnum site
 Record Covers — at rodneymatthews.com

2011 albums
Magnum (band) albums
Albums produced by Tony Clarkin
SPV/Steamhammer albums